Justice Harper may refer to:

Charles A. Harper (born c. 1815), associate justice of the Arkansas Supreme Court
Lubbie Harper Jr. (born 1942), associate justice of the Connecticut Supreme Court